Eutyrannosauria is a clade of tyrannosauroid theropods whose distribution has been found in what is now Asia and North America. The clade consists of an evolutionary grade of tyrannosaurs such as Appalachiosaurus, Dryptosaurus, and Bistahieversor which led up to the family Tyrannosauridae. The group was named in 2018 by Delcourt and Grillo in their paper about possible southern hemisphere tyrannosauroids and the phylogeography of tyrannosaurs.

Classification
Below is a phylogeographic cladogram of Eutyrannosauria after Voris et al. (2020):

References

Tyrannosaurs